Joel Waldfogel is an American economist and the Frederick R. Kappel Chair in Applied Economics at the University of Minnesota's Carlson School of Management.

Education and career
Waldfogel grew up in South Minneapolis, Minnesota, where he attended Washburn High School. He then attended Brandeis University, where he received his B.A. in economics in 1984. He received his Ph.D. from Stanford University in 1990, also in economics. Before joining the University of Minnesota in 2010, he was the Ehrenkranz Family Professor of Business and Public Policy at the Wharton School of the University of Pennsylvania from 2003 to 2010. From 2006 to 2009, he was the chair of Wharton's Business and Public Policy Department, and he served as the Associate Vice Dean for their Doctoral Program from 2000 to 2005.

Books
The Tyranny of the Market (Harvard University Press, 2007)
Scroogenomics (Princeton University Press, 2009)

References

External links
Faculty page
Personal page

1962 births
Living people
Carlson School of Management faculty
Yale University faculty
Wharton School of the University of Pennsylvania faculty
Stanford University alumni
People from Minneapolis
Brandeis University alumni
Economists from Minnesota
21st-century American economists